The following are the national records in track cycling in Nigeria, maintained by its national cycling federation, Cycling Federation of Nigeria (CFN).

Men

Women

References

External links
CFN official website

Nigeria
Track cycling
Records
Track cycling